Curtiss Bay is a bay about  wide, indenting the west coast of Graham Land just north of the Chavdar Peninsula, and entered between Cape Sterneck and Cape Andreas on the Davis Coast. Its head is fed by Samodiva Glacier, Pirin Glacier and Tumba Ice Cap.

The name Bahia Inutil (useless bay) appearing on a 1957 Argentine chart is considered misleading; the bay has been used as an anchorage. The bay was renamed by the UK Antarctic Place-Names Committee in 1960 for Glenn Curtiss, an American aeronautical engineer who pioneered seaplanes from 1911 onward.

References 

Bays of Graham Land
Davis Coast